The 2001 WNBA season was the fifth season for the franchise. The team saw themselves in the WNBA Finals for the only time in their history. They lost the finals to the Los Angeles Sparks in a sweep.

Offseason

WNBA Draft

Regular season

Season standings

Season schedule

Playoffs

Player stats

References

Charlotte Sting seasons
Charlotte
Charlotte Sting
Eastern Conference (WNBA) championship seasons